Roderic Ai Camp (born 1945) is an American academic specialized in Mexican studies. He is a frequent consultant to international media including the BBC, The New York Times, The Wall Street Journal, National Public Radio, and was once a contributing editor to Microsoft Encarta.

He has briefed several institutions, including the United States House of Representatives, the U.S. Senate Committee on Foreign Relations, and at least five U.S. ambassadors to Mexico for the U.S. Department of State. Currently, he is the Philip McKenna Professor of the Pacific Rim at Claremont McKenna College, in California, United States.

Biography
Camp was born in Colfax, Washington, to Ortho O. Camp, a small businessman, and Helen Camp, a counselor. He has served as a sergeant in the U.S. Marine Corps. He and his wife, librarian Emily Ellen Morse  married October 1, 1966. They have two children: Christopher, Alexander.

Camp graduated with both a bachelor's degree (1963–66) and a master's degree in International Affairs (1966–67) from George Washington University and completed a doctorate degree in Comparative Politics and History at the University of Arizona (1967–70). He tracks his interest in Mexican topics back to his years growing up among Mexican immigrants in Orange, a small citrus farming community outside Los Angeles.

He started his academic career at Central College in Iowa and later joined the Department of Political Science at Tulane University in 1991.

On 15 October 2009, Camp received a Doctor of Humane Letters honorary degree from St. Olaf College.

In September, 2017, he received the Order of the Aztec Eagle Medal, the highest award the Mexican government can award a foreigner, for his contributions to Mexicans and Mexico.

In 2017, he became a Global Scholar, Woodrow Wilson International Center for Scholars, Smithsonian Institution.

Selected publications
Camp has written more than thirty books, most of them on topics related to Mexico. Eight of them have received "Outstanding" designations by Choice magazine, a publication of the Association of College & Research Libraries (ACRL) of the American Library Association.

 The Role of Economists in Policy Making: A Comparative Study of Mexico and the United States (University of Arizona Press, 1977)
 Mexico's Leaders, Their Education and Recruitment (University of Arizona Press, 1980).
 The Making of a Government: The Socialization of Political Leaders in Post-Revolutionary Mexico (University of Arizona Press, 1984). Winner of the "Choice Outstanding Academic Book, 1985".
 Intellectuals and the State in Twentieth Century Mexico (University of Texas Press, 1985). Winner of the "Choice Outstanding Academic Book, 1986".
 Mexico's Political Stability, the Next Five Years (Editor, Westview Press, 1986).
 Memoirs of a Mexican Politician (University of New Mexico Press, 1988).
 Entrepreneurs and Politics in Twentieth Century Mexico (Oxford University Press, 1989).
 Mexican Political Biographies, 1884-1935 (University of Texas Press, 1991).
 Who's Who in Mexico Today (Westview Press, 1993). Winner of the "Choice Outstanding Reference Book, 1988".
 Politics in Mexico, the Democratic Consolidation (Oxford University Press, 2007). Winner of the "Choice Outstanding Academic Book, 1993" and recommended in the Council on Foreign Relations Reading List on Mexican Politics blog by Shannon O'Neil, August 18, 2009.
 The Successor, A Political Thriller (University of New Mexico Press, 1993).
 Mexican Political Biographies, 1935-1993 (University of Texas Press, 1995). Winner of the "American Reference Book Annual Outstanding Reference Book" and "Choice Outstanding Academic Book".
 Political Recruitment Across Two Centuries, Mexico, 1884-1999 (University of Texas Press, 1995).
 Crossing Swords, Politics and Religion in Mexico (Oxford University Press, 1997).
 Editor, Citizen Views of Democracy in Latin America (University of Pittsburgh Press, 2001).
 Mexico's Mandarins, Crafting a Power Elite for the 21st Century (University of California Press, 2002).
 Mexico's Military on the Democratic Stage (Center for Strategic & International Studies/Praeger, 2005).
 Politics in Mexico, The Democratic Consolidation (Oxford University Press, 2007).
 The Metamorphosis of Leadership in a Democratic Mexico (Oxford University Press, 2010).
 Mexico, What Everyone Needs to Know (Oxford University Press, 2011).
 Mexican Political Biographies, 1939-2009 4th edit. (University of Texas Press, 2011)Winner of the "Choice Outstanding Academic Book, 2011"
 Oxford Handbook of Mexican Politics (Oxford University Press, 2012).
   Politics in Mexico, Democratic Consolidation or Decline? (Oxford University Press, 2013).
   Mexico, What Everyone Needs to Know" 2nd edit. (Oxford University Press, 2017).
   Politics in Mexico, The Path of a New Democracy (Oxford University Press, 2019).

References

External links
Roderic Ai Camp's homepage at Claremont McKenna College.

Latin Americanists
Elliott School of International Affairs alumni
University of Arizona alumni
Claremont McKenna College faculty
Academic staff of El Colegio de México
Tulane University faculty
Living people
1945 births
Central College (Iowa) faculty
United States Marines
American twins
Fulbright alumni